Peter Seidel (December 2, 1926, Milwaukee, Wisconsin) is an American architect-planner turned writer.

Life
Seidel moved from Ann Arbor, Michigan to Ohio to plan a new town outside of Cincinnati, Ohio. His plans for the new town never came to fruition, but he instead built an eco-community in Clermont County on 188 acres of land. Seidel's goal for this was a place where residents could get a feel of nature.

Seidel lives in Northside, Cincinnati.

Works

Projects 
1964, "Central–Linear City: An environmentally and sociologically sound alternative to urban sprawl". Virginia Polytechnic Institute, Virginia Engineering Extension Series Circular No. 2. 
1968,  "A Proposal for Urban Development, a further development of Central-Linear City done at the University of Michigan". 
1968, "Peter Seidel's Model City". one hour documentary, University of Michigan Television.
1971, Winter. "New Cities of Man: a Proposal". Illinois Institute of Technology, Technology and Human Affairs, pp. 19–22, 
1972, "'Idustructure', a Vertical Industrial Park Designed for Use in the Central City". Inland Architect, August–September 1972, pp.22-23.
1972, "One Man's, Dream". The Cincinnati Enquirer, July 30, 1972, pp. 14 – 20. About an unrealized eco-community.
1974, "Proposal for an Integrated Energy System for Buildings, Utilizing Solar Energy". The Eco-Tech Foundation, Inc.
1979, "Six Units on 7, 600 sq. ft." Housing, February, 1979, pp. 60–63. An example of energy conserving, high density, urban infill housing.
1981, "Stacked Condos at 27 Units per Acre". Housing, December, 1981,  pp. 38–39. An example of energy conserving, high density, urban infill housing.
1989-90, "Invisible Walls". Preproduction funding for one-hour television documentary. Production funding not obtained.

Books
1998, Invisible Walls: Why We Ignore the Damage We Inflict on the Planet ... and Ourselves. Amherst, New York: Prometheus Books.  
2006, Global Survival: The Challenge and its Implications For Thinking and Acting. edited with Ervin Laszlo. New York: Select Books. 
2009, 2045: a Story of our Future. Amherst, New York: Prometheus Books.  
2020, Uncommon Sense: Shortcomings of the Human Mind for Handling Big-Picture, Long-Term Challenges. Arlington: Steady State Press.

Articles
1982, "Developing Increased Density Condominiums". Commercial Investment Journal, vol. 1 (Summer 1982): 34-37.
1985, "Mies today: Thoughts of a Former Student". Inland Architect, March/April 1985, p. 45.
1994, "Cities and the Real World". World Futures, vol. 39, No. 4, 1994, pp. 183–195.
1998, "The Cost of Wealthy Modern Cities". Indian Journal of Applied Economics, July–September, 1998, pp. 291–301.
2009, September, "Is it Inevitable that Evolution Self Destruct?" Futures, vol.41, no. 10 (December, 2009): 754–75.

References 

1926 births
Living people
Architects from Milwaukee
University of Michigan faculty